WIFC (95.5 FM) is a top 40 (CHR) radio station located in Wausau, Wisconsin. The station is owned and operated locally by Midwest Communications, previously owned by Journal Communications, Dave Raven (Raven Broadcasting) and originally Forward Communications. The call letters WIFC stand for WIsconsin Forward Communications. WIFC's main competition comes from HOT 96-7 (WHTQ), a top 40-CHR radio station broadcasting to the same area.

Formerly WSAU-FM (a beautiful music station), WIFC has broadcast its current format since August 1969, making it one of the longest-running continuously-broadcasting CHR-top 40 stations in the United States.

History 
WSAU-FM began broadcasting August 29, 1948, and was one of the first FM Stations in Wisconsin to broadcast in Stereo in the early 1960s.  It and sister station WSAU were originally owned by The Milwaukee Journal.

References

External links 
 
Midwest Communications

IFC
Contemporary hit radio stations in the United States
Modern adult contemporary radio stations
Radio stations established in 1948
1948 establishments in Wisconsin
Midwest Communications radio stations